Uncle Bräsig is a 1936 German historical comedy film directed by Erich Waschneck and starring Otto Wernicke, Heinrich Schroth and Harry Hardt. It marked the film debut of the Swedish actress Kristina Söderbaum who went on to be a major star of Nazi cinema. Söderbaum won her part in a contest organised by UFA. It was based on the 1862 novel From My Farming Days by Fritz Reuter. The film was shot at the Grunewald Studios in Berlin with sets designed by the art director Robert A. Dietrich.

Cast
 Otto Wernicke as Onkel Bräsig
 Heinrich Schroth as Karl Hawermann
 Harry Hardt as Baron Axel von Rambow
 Suse Graf as Luise Hawermann
 Elga Brink as Frau Frieda von Rambow
 Carsta Löck as Nahrhafte Mamsell
 Hans Richter as Triddelfitz, Volontär
 Fritz Hoopts as Jochen Nüssler
 Jakob Tiedtke as Pomuchelskopp
 Erich Fiedler as Gottlieb
 Hans Brausewetter as Rudolf, Jungbauer
 Hildegard Barko as Linning, Zwillingsschwester
 Kristina Söderbaum as Minning, Zwillingsschwester
 Ursula Herking as Malchen
 Babsi Schultz-Reckewell as Margaret, seine Tochter
 Kurt Fischer-Fehling s Franz von Rambow
 Paul Westermeier as Rektor Baldrian
 Magdalena Schmidt as Seine Frau
 Albert Arid as Knecht
 Dorothea Thiess as Seine Frau
 Fritz Rasp as Slusohr, ein Gauner
 Lena Haustein as Salchen
 Julius E. Herrmann as Kaufmann Kurz
 William Huch as Kammerrat von Rambow
 Karl Junge-Swinburne as Amtmann
 Robert Leffler as Sadenwasser
 Klaus Pohl as Nachtwächter
 Gustav Rickelt as Der Lehrer
 Manny Ziener as Frau Nüssler

See also
During My Apprenticeship (1919)

References

Bibliography
 
 Klaus, Ulrich J. Deutsche Tonfilme: Jahrgang 1936. Klaus-Archiv, 1988.

External links

1936 films
1936 comedy films
1930s German-language films
Films directed by Erich Waschneck
Films based on German novels
Films of Nazi Germany
UFA GmbH films
German black-and-white films
Remakes of German films
Sound film remakes of silent films
Films set in the 19th century
German historical comedy films
1930s historical comedy films
1930s German films